Hesar-e Sangi (also Romanized as Ḩeşār-e Sangī; also known as Ḩeşār and Hisār) is a village in Fasharud Rural District, in the Central District of Birjand County, South Khorasan Province, Iran. At the 2016 census, its population was 275, in 97 families.

References 

Populated places in Birjand County